Enerio Del Rosario (born October 16, 1985) is a former right-handed pitcher.  He was signed in 2005 at the age of 19.

Career
He was added to the Cincinnati Reds 40 man roster after the 2009 season to protect him from the Rule 5 draft.  Despite owning a 2.09 ERA in 9 games, Del Rosario allowed 13 hits in just 8 innings of work while also walking 4 batters. He was designated for assignment on September 13, 2010.

On September 16, 2010 Del Rosario was traded to the Houston Astros for cash considerations and added to the 40-man roster.

In 2011, Del Rosario appeared in a career high 54 games for the Astros. His control was an issue, as he issued the same number of walks as strikeouts in 53 innings.

Del Rosario was outrighted to the Astros' Triple-A affiliate Oklahoma City RedHawks on July 28, 2012.  He was called up to the Major League roster on September 10 when Francisco Cordero was released. Del Rosario was designated for assignment by the Astros on October 26, 2012, when Che-Hsuan Lin was claimed off waivers from the Boston Red Sox. In 2013, he pitched in the Mexican League for the Acereros de Monclova.

References

External links

1985 births
Acereros de Monclova players
Billings Mustangs players
Caribes de Anzoátegui players
Carolina Mudcats players
Cincinnati Reds players
Dayton Dragons players
Dominican Republic expatriate baseball players in Mexico
Dominican Republic expatriate baseball players in the United States
Estrellas Orientales players
Gigantes del Cibao players
Gulf Coast Astros players
Houston Astros players

Living people
Louisville Bats players
Major League Baseball players from the Dominican Republic
Mexican League baseball pitchers
Oklahoma City RedHawks players
Sarasota Reds players
Dominican Republic expatriate baseball players in Venezuela